WUDW-LD, virtual 53 and UHF digital channel 15, is a low-powered Buzzr-affiliated television station licensed to Richmond, Virginia, United States. The station is owned by the DTV America subsidiary of HC2 Holdings.

History 
The station’s construction permit was initially issued on March 13, 2014 under the calls of W15DW-D. It was then changed to the current WUDW-LD callsign. In October 2021 WUDW-LD was granted to change its virtual channel number from 15 to 53, due to a virtual channel overlap from PBS member station WHRO-TV in Norfolk Va.

Digital channels
The station's digital signal is multiplexed:

References

External links
DTV America

Low-power television stations in the United States
Innovate Corp.
UDW-LD
Television channels and stations established in 2014
2014 establishments in Virginia